Judge Dee, or Judge Di, is a semi-fictional character based on the historical figure Di Renjie, county magistrate and statesman of the Tang court. The character appeared in the 18th-century Chinese detective and gong'an crime novel Di Gong An. After Robert van Gulik came across it in an antiquarian book store in Tokyo, he translated the novel into English and then used the style and characters to write his own original Judge Dee historical mystery stories.

The series is set in Tang dynasty China and deals with criminal cases solved by the upright and shrewd Judge Dee, who as county magistrate in the Chinese imperial legal system was both the investigating magistrate and judge.

Dee Goong An

The Judge Dee character is based on the historical figure Di Renjie (c. 630 – c. 700), magistrate and statesman of the Tang court. During the Ming dynasty (1368–1644) in China, a "folk novel" was written set in former times, but filled with anachronisms.

Van Gulik found in the 18th-century Di Gong An (lit. "Cases of Judge Dee") an original tale dealing with three cases simultaneously, and, which was unusual among Chinese mystery tales, a plot that for the most part lacked an overbearing supernatural element which could alienate Western readers.  He translated it into English and had it published in 1949 under the title Celebrated Cases of Judge Dee.

Van Gulik's stories
This gave van Gulik the idea of writing his own novels, set with the similar Ming anachronisms, but using the historical character. Van Gulik was careful in writing the main novels to deal with cases wherein Dee was newly appointed to a city, thereby isolating him from the existing lifestyle and enabling him to maintain an objective role in the books. Van Gulik's novels and stories, often referred to as the Shih Ti, made no direct reference to the original Chinese work, and Celebrated Cases of Judge Dee is not considered to be part of the Judge Dee series.

Initially Dee is assisted only by his faithful clerk, Sergeant Hoong Liang, an old family retainer. However, in The Chinese Gold Murders, which describes Dee's initial appointment and first criminal cases, the judge encounters two highwaymen, euphemistically called "men of the greenwood", Ma Joong and Chiao Tai, who attempt to rob him but are so impressed with his character that they give up their criminal careers and join his retinue on the spot. This encounter is recounted in a short flashback passage in the original Di Gong An, taking place when the two are already long-serving loyal members of his retinue. A little later, in The Chinese Lake Murders, a third criminal, Tao Gan, an itinerant confidence trickster and swindler, similarly joins. Judge Dee ends his career in Murder in Canton being promoted to the position of senior Metropolitan Judge in the capital, and his assistants obtain official ranks in the Army and civil service.

Van Gulik also wrote a series of newspaper comics about Judge Dee in 1964–1967, which totalled 19 adventures. The first four were regular balloon strips, but the later 15 had the more typically Dutch textblock under the pictures.

Judge Dee, naturally, is responsible for deciding sentences as well as assessing guilt or innocence, although van Gulik notes in the stories that all capital punishments must be referred to and decided by officials in the capital. One of the sentences he frequently has to deal with is slow slicing; if he is inclined to mercy, he orders the final, fatal, cut to be made first, thus rendering the ceremony anticlimactic.

Other authors
Several other authors have created stories based on Van Gulik's Judge Dee character:
 French author Frédéric Lenormand  wrote 19 new Judge Dee mysteries from year 2004 at Editions Fayard, Paris (not yet translated into English). Some of them have been translated into Spanish (Ediciones Paidos Iberica), Portuguese (Europress), Bulgarian (Paradox), Czech (Garamond) and Polish.
 Sven Roussel, another French author, has written La dernière enquête du Juge Ti.
 The Chinese-American author Zhu Xiao Di wrote ten original short stories about Judge Dee collected in Tales of Judge Dee (2006), set when the Judge was the magistrate of Poo-yang (the same time period as The Chinese Bell Murders and several other novels). Zhu Xiao Di has no relation to Robert van Gulik but tried to stay faithful to the fictionalized history of van Gulik's Judge Dee.
 Judge Dee appears, along with a fictionalized Wu Zetian, in books one (Iron Empress: A Novel of Mystery and Madness in Ancient China) and two (Shore of Pearls: A Novel of Murder, Plague, and the Prison Island of Hainan) of Eleanor Cooney & Daniel Alteri's historical T'ang Trilogy.
 Qiu Xiaolong, best known for his Inspector Chen series, released a new Judge Dee novel The Shadow of the Empire in 2021.

Bibliography

By van Gulik
The following novels and short stories were published in English by van Gulik. The short story collection Judge Dee at Work (published in 1967) contains a "Judge Dee Chronology" detailing Dee's various posts in specific years and stories set in these times. Van Gulik's last two books, Poets and Murder and Necklace and Calabash, were not listed in the chronology, as they were written after Judge Dee at Work, but they are both set in the time when Judge Dee was the magistrate in Poo-yang.

By other authors
By the author Frédéric Lenormand (not yet translated into English):
 Le Château du lac Tchou-an (2004) - The Zhou-an lake castle
 La Nuit des juges (2004) - The Night of the judges
 Petits meurtres entre moines (2004) - Little murders among monks
 Le Palais des courtisanes (2004) - The courtesans' palace
 Madame Ti mène l'enquête (2005) - Mrs. Dee investigates
 Mort d'un cuisinier chinois (2005) - Death of a Chinese cook
 L'Art délicat du deuil (2006) - The Delicate art of mourning
 Mort d'un maître de go (2006) - Death of a Go master
 Dix petits démons chinois (2007) - Ten little Chinese devils
 Médecine chinoise à l'usage des assassins (2007) - Chinese Medicine for murderers
 Guide de survie d'un juge en Chine (2008) - Survival guide for the Chinese judge
 Panique sur la Grande Muraille (2008) - Panic on the Great Wall
 Le Mystère du jardin chinois (2009) - The Chinese Garden Mystery
 Diplomatie en kimono (2009) - Diplomacy in a Kimono
 Thé vert et arsenic (2010) - Arsenic and green tea
 Un Chinois ne ment jamais (2010) - A Chinese never lies
 Divorce à la chinoise (2011) - Chinese-style Divorce
 Meurtres sur le fleuve Jaune (2011) - The Yellow River Murders

By the author Zhu Xiao Di:
 Tales of Judge Dee (2006), ten short stories set in the time when Judge Dee is magistrate of Poo-yang (AD 669–670), 

By the author Sven Roussel:
 La Dernière Enquète du Juge Ti (2008) set at the end Judge Dee's term of service in Lan Fang (AD 675)

By authors Eleanor Cooney & Daniel Alteri:
 Iron Empress: A Novel of Mystery and Madness in Ancient China (formerly titled Deception: A Novel of Mystery and Madness in Ancient China), Book One of the T'ang Trilogy,  
 Shore of Pearls: A Novel of Murder, Plague, and the Prison Island of Hainan, Book Two of the T'ang Trilogy, 

By Lin Qianyu (林千羽):
 狄仁杰 通天帝国 (2010), tie-in novel of Tsui Hark 2010 film: Detective Dee and the Mystery of the Phantom Flame, 

By the author Hock G. Tjoa:
 The Ingenious Judge Dee (2013), a theatrical play based on Dee Goong An, 

By Qiu Xiaolong:
 In the Shadow of the Empire (2021),

Adaptations

Comics
The stories have been adapted into comic strips by Dutch artists Fritz Kloezeman between 1964 and 1969 and Dick Matena in 2000.

TV
Judge Dee has been adapted for television twice in English:
 In 1969, Howard Baker produced six Judge Dee stories for Granada Television. These episodes were in black and white and were not a ratings success. English actor Michael Goodliffe portrayed the Judge.
 In 1974, Gerald Isenberg adapted the novel The Haunted Monastery into a television movie, titled Judge Dee and the Monastery Murders. It starred Khigh Dhiegh as Judge Dee. With the exception of the star (who generally played East Asian roles but was of English and North African descent), the movie had an all-Asian cast, including Mako, Soon-Tek Oh, Keye Luke, and James Hong. The writing was credited to Nicholas Meyer and Robert van Gulik. It was nominated for an Edgar Award, for Best Television Feature or Miniseries in 1975.

Some of Robert van Gulik's Judge Dee stories have been adapted for Chinese TV by CCTV, under the title of Detective Di Renjie, most of which star Liang Guanhua as Detective Di. As of 2012, four different DVD series are available with one series so far with English subtitles. CCTV produced series in 2004, 2006, 2008 and 2010. The series from 2010, entitled "Detective Di Renjie" has been produced on DVD by Tai Seng entertainment with English subtitles.

The list of series:
 Amazing Detective Di Renjie (2004)
 Amazing Detective Di Renjie 2 (2006)
 Amazing Detective Di Renjie 3 (2008)
 Mad Detective Di Renjie (2010)

Movies
 Detective Dee and the Mystery of the Phantom Flame (2010)
 Young Detective Dee: Rise of the Sea Dragon (2013)
 Detective Dee: The Four Heavenly Kings (2018)

See also 
 Early Chinese detective fiction

References

Sources
 Accardo, Pasquale J. (2011).  China's Sherlock Holmes: The Life and Times of Robert van Gulik's Judge Dee. Eugenia, ON: The Battered Silicon Dispatch Box.  . The esteemed member of the Baker Street Irregulars and commentator on both Sherlock Holmes and Father Brown summarizes the career of Robert van Gulik's presentation of Judge Dee, with detailed plot outlines, character biographies, chronologies, and a discussion of the phenomenon of "doubling" throughout the series.
  A scholar of American detective fiction explores the historical Chinese figures, the tradition of the Chinese detective story, China and Chinese in American literature, and van Gulik's adaptations.

External links
 Judge Dee: Character chronology and information about the author 
 The Judge Dee website by Sven Roussel
 Fansite containing detailed publishing history in various languages 

 
Dutch novels
Dutch crime novels
Fictional historical detectives
Fictional judges
Gong'an fiction
Judge Dee
Fiction about law
Detective fiction
Dutch novels adapted into television shows
Novels adapted into comics
Literary characters introduced in 1949
Fictional Tang dynasty people
Fictional Chinese people